Matías Leonardo Escobar (born April 21, 1982) is an Argentine football midfielder who most recently played for Club Atletico Los Andes in the Primera B Nacional.

Career

Escobar started his professional career in 2004 with Gimnasia y Esgrima de La Plata where he made over 100 appearances. In 2008, he joined Kayserispor but returned to Argentina on loan to Rosario Central in 2009. In August 2009, he was loaned to Atlético Tucumán

References

External links
 Argentine Primera statistics at Futbol XXI
Guardian statistics
 

1982 births
Living people
Footballers from Rosario, Santa Fe
Argentine footballers
Argentine expatriate footballers
Club de Gimnasia y Esgrima La Plata footballers
Rosario Central footballers
Atlético Tucumán footballers
Kayserispor footballers
Boca Unidos footballers
Club Atlético Tigre footballers
Expatriate footballers in Turkey
Doxa Katokopias FC players
Enosis Neon Paralimni FC players
Expatriate footballers in Cyprus
Argentine Primera División players
Süper Lig players
Cypriot First Division players
Association football midfielders